The House of Montecuccoli is the name of an old Italian noble family, descending from Montecuccoli Castle, Pavullo nel Frignano in the former Duchy of Modena. In later parts of its history, a branch of it became thoroughly Austrian in identity and loyalty, though keeping the Italian name.

Notable members 
Count Ernesto Montecuccoli (1582-1633), general for the Holy Roman Empire in the Thirty Years' War
Leopold Philip Montecuccoli (1663–1698), Austrian general, Prince of the Holy Roman Empire
Raimondo Montecuccoli (1609–1680), Italian military general in Austrian service
Rudolf Montecuccoli (1843–1922), chief of the Austro-Hungarian Navy
Sebastiano de Montecuccoli (died 1536), Italian nobleman in French service

See also
Condottieri class cruiser, also called Montecuccoli class cruiser
Italian cruiser Raimondo Montecuccoli, an Italian Navy light cruiser in commission from 1935 to 1964

Italian noble families
Austrian noble families